Patricia Castle Richardson (born February 23, 1951) is an American actress best known for her portrayal of Jill Taylor on the ABC sitcom Home Improvement, for which she was nominated four times for the Primetime Emmy Award for Outstanding Lead Actress in a Comedy Series and twice for the Golden Globe Award for Best Actress in a Television Series – Comedy or Musical. She also received an Independent Spirit Award nomination for her performance in Ulee's Gold (1997).

Early life
Richardson attended multiple schools including Holton-Arms School and Hockaday School. She is a 1972 graduate of Southern Methodist University, where she was friends with classmates Beth Henley and Stephen Tobolowsky, who was slated to be a cast member of Home Improvement, but had other contractual commitments when the series began filming. Tobolowsky initially suggested to producers of Home Improvement that Richardson be considered for the role of Jill Taylor after Frances Fisher was deemed too serious for the role.

Career
Richardson began as the understudy for the role of Gypsy Rose Lee in Angela Lansbury's Broadway production of Gypsy: A Musical Fable in 1974, also playing several small chorus parts. In the next ten years she worked in regional theater, commercials, and other Broadway and Off- Broadway plays. She had roles in programs such as The Equalizer, Spencer For Hire, and Kate & Allie. She appeared in one episode of The Cosby Show in the third season with her real-life husband, playing a woman giving birth to her ninth child. Richardson also appeared in the films Christmas Evil and C.H.U.D.. In 1989, she appeared in one episode of Quantum Leap as a radio station owner.

In 1983, she left New York for LA briefly to do a sitcom centered around Katey Sagal's twin sisters, Liz and Jean Sagal, called Double Trouble, for Norman Lear. When asked to go back and do a second season after her contract had expired, she passed in order to stay in New York and continue performing in Beth Henley's The Miss Firecracker Contest off-Broadway. A few years later Allan Burns, who co-created The Mary Tyler Moore Show, brought her back to Los Angeles to star in two sitcoms he produced: Eisenhower and Lutz and FM. Both shows ran for 13 episodes.

In 1991, three months after giving birth to twins, Richardson became a last-minute replacement for Frances Fisher in what would be her breakout role as Jill Taylor on the ABC sitcom Home Improvement. Richardson received four Emmy nominations, and two Golden Globe nominations in this role. While working on Home Improvement, she hosted the Emmys with Ellen DeGeneres, starred in the miniseries Undue Influence with Brian Dennehy, Sophie and the Moonhanger on Lifetime with Lynn Whitfield, and earned an Independent Spirit nomination in 1997 for her first major theatrical film role in Ulee's Gold.

In 2002, Richardson replaced Janine Turner in the Lifetime medical drama series Strong Medicine, as a new character, Dr. Andy Campbell. She was nominated for two Prism Awards for her work in Strong Medicine. After three seasons on that show, she was cast in a recurring role as Sheila Brooks, campaign manager for Republican presidential candidate Arnold Vinick (Alan Alda) in the final two seasons of NBC political drama The West Wing.
 
Richardson appeared in the first season of Law & Order: Special Victims Unit. In 2008, she was the executive producer of the video documentary Long Story Short, which tells the story of Larry and Trudie Long, a popular Asian American nightclub act of the '40s and '50s, told through the eyes of their daughter and her friend, actress Jodi Long. In 2010, she appeared in an NBC made-for-TV film, The Jensen Project, and in 2011, she appeared in the Lifetime television film Bringing Ashley Home, also starring A.J. Cook and Jennifer Morrison. In 2012, she starred in the coming-of-age film Beautiful Wave and in the following year appeared in the Hallmark Channel TV film Smart Cookies. Since then, Richardson has filmed several small independent films and two more movies for the Hallmark channel, Friend Request and Snow Bride.

On the twelfth episode of the fourth season of Last Man Standing titled "Helen Potts", Richardson guest-starred as the titular character and reunited with her former Home Improvement co-star, Tim Allen. At the end of the episode, it was revealed that one of her sons' name is Randy, who was portrayed by her other Home Improvement co-star; Jonathan Taylor Thomas. She returned as Helen Potts in the next season.

In 2015, she ran for the position of national president of the SAG-AFTRA, after she had served on the board for one term. She lost the election narrowly to incumbent President Ken Howard. She was re-elected to the National and Local Los Angeles Boards of SAG-AFTRA.

In 2016, Richardson returned to the stage in  Steel Magnolias at the Bucks County Playhouse in New Hope, Pennsylvania. This production was directed by four time Oscar nominee Marsha Mason, and also starred Elaine Hendrix, Lucy DeVito, Jessica Walter and Susan Sullivan.
On June 9, 2016, this production became the highest-grossing show in the history of the Bucks County Playhouse.

Personal life
Richardson married fellow actor Ray Baker in 1982. They had three children together: Henry Richardson Baker, twins Roxanne Elizabeth Baker and Joseph Castle Baker, before they divorced in August 1995. Richardson is the godmother of actress Betty Gilpin, the daughter of actor Jack Gilpin. 

Richardson had a long-term relationship with retired psychologist Mark Cline, whom she had met when they were both students at Southern Methodist University.

Richardson served many years on the Board of Directors and is the National Spokesperson for "Cure PSP", a patient advocacy and research organization for progressive supranuclear palsy, corticobasal degeneration, multiple system atrophy and related "Prime Of Life" diseases. Her father died of PSP in 2005.

Richardson is a Methodist and a registered Democrat.

Filmography

Film

Television

References

External links

 
 

1951 births
Actresses from Maryland
American film actresses
American television actresses
Living people
People from Bethesda, Maryland
Southern Methodist University alumni
20th-century American actresses
21st-century American actresses
Hockaday School alumni
California Democrats
Maryland Democrats
Methodists from Maryland